Kajaani sub-region is a subdivision of Kainuu and one of the Sub-regions of Finland since 2009.

Municipalities
 Kajaani
 Paltamo
 Ristijärvi
 Sotkamo

Sub-regions of Finland
Geography of Kainuu